Bethany Catherine Balcer (born March 7, 1997) is an American professional soccer player who plays as a forward for OL Reign in the National Women's Soccer League (NWSL).

Balcer played collegiate soccer at Spring Arbor University, where she was a two-time NAIA national champion, three-time NAIA National Player of the Year, four-time First-Team All-American, and the school's leading scorer. After her collegiate career, she joined Reign FC on a supplemental contract in 2019.

Early life
Balcer grew up in Hudsonville, Michigan and attended Unity Christian High School, where she played varsity soccer. She is the fourth of five children.

Collegiate career
Balcer attended Spring Arbor University from 2015 to 2019, where she was a four-year starter on its varsity soccer team. The Cougars advanced to the NAIA Final Four every year and won two national titles with Balcer on the team.

While in college, Balcer played as an amateur with senior teams over the summer. She led Grand Rapids FC to a United Women's Soccer championship in 2017 – scoring hat-tricks in five straight matches – and played with Seattle Sounders Women in the Women's Premier Soccer League the following year.

Club career

OL Reign, 2019–
Balcer was invited to the Reign FC preseason training camp prior to the 2019 NWSL season and subsequently earned a contract on the club's supplemental roster. She is the first NAIA player to sign with an NWSL club and only the third NWSL player to previously play collegiately in the United States and finish their collegiate career with a non-NCAA D-I institution.
Balcer made her NWSL debut coming on as an 86th minute substitute at Houston on April 14, 2019. A week later, she made her first start in Reign's home-opener at Cheney Stadium. Curling a shot from the edge of the penalty area into the far corner of the goal, she scored her first–ever pro goal in the 21st minute against Orlando Pride in a 1–1 tie. It was also the first home goal scored in the Reign's first season in Tacoma.
She scored her second goal in her second home start, sixth appearance on May 27, 2019 in a 2–1 win against the champions North Carolina Courage. Her 13th minute header from the edge of the box crashed off the underside of the bar to give her side an early lead. 
Her third goal occurred in the next game in her third home start against Houston Dash. On a breakaway she picked up a deflected through ball from Darian Jenkins and slotted right-footed past the keeper for the first goal of the game in the 32nd minute, Houston tied in the 90th to split the points. At the end of the season, she was awarded the 2019 Rookie of the Year Award.

International career
Balcer was a United States youth international at the U23 level.

Balcer received her first call-up to the United States women's national soccer team in December 2019. She made her international debut on November 26, 2021 against Australia.

Personal life
Balcer is a Christian.
She is the sister of Nick Balcer, a National Assistant Referee with PRO and younger brother Grant, who plays Division 1 soccer at Bowling Green University.

Career statistics

Club

International

Honors
OL Reign
 NWSL Shield: 2022
 The Women's Cup: 2022

Individual
 NWSL Rookie of the Year: 2019
 NWSL Players' Rookie of the Year: 2019
 NWSL Second XI: 2019
 NWSL Player of the Week: 2021: Weeks 12, 16

References

External links
 
 Spring Arbor Cougars profile 

OL Reign players
1997 births
Living people
Spring Arbor Cougars women's soccer players
People from Hudsonville, Michigan
Soccer players from Michigan
Seattle Sounders Women players
National Women's Soccer League players
Women's association football forwards
American women's soccer players
United States women's international soccer players